is a Japanese football player who plays for Eastern Lions.

Club career
After graduation from Fujieda Higashi high school in 2003, Oi signed with the local club, Júbilo Iwata. He made his professional debut on 16 July 2003 in the J.League Cup match against Tokyo Verdy. His first league start at Kobe Wing Stadium in the 2–1 defeat to Vissel Kobe on 26 September 2004. He was a first team regular in the 2007 season, appearing in 26 games. In 2011, Oi joined Shonan Bellmare on a one-year loan. He made 36 league appearances for Bellmare, scoring 2 goals. At the end of his loan at Bellmare, he turned down the opportunity to sign a new contract with Jubilo Iwata.

On 7 January 2011, Oi completed a permanent move to Albirex Niigata.

National team career
Oi was a member of the Japan U-17 national team for the 2001 U-17 World Championship. Oi played 3 games in the competition but the team was eliminated after the group stage.

Club statistics
Updated to 8 August 2022.

References

External links
 

Profile at Jubilo Iwata

1984 births
Living people
Association football people from Shizuoka Prefecture
Japanese footballers
Japan youth international footballers
J1 League players
J2 League players
National Premier Leagues  players
Júbilo Iwata players
Shonan Bellmare players
Albirex Niigata players
Association football defenders
People from Fujieda, Shizuoka